Heavener Runestone Park (pronounced ) is a  park located in Le Flore County, Oklahoma near the city of Heavener, Oklahoma. Formerly a state park of Oklahoma, it was transferred to the City of Heavener in 2011, and is now operated by the Friends of Heavener Runestone, a non-profit organization. The Festival held at the park on two weekends a year serves as a fundraiser for operating and maintaining the park.

Opened in 1970, the park has been erected around the Heavener Runestone, a rock found in 1923, and most likely inscribed in the 19th century, perhaps by a Swedish immigrant. The stone is located on Poteau Mountain just outside the town's limits in the scrub-forest foothills of the Ouachita Mountains.

Assessment of the runestone

Media state that the inscription was probably a claim marker meaning "valley belonging to Glome," or "Glome's Valley." There is no evidence of Norse presence and nothing similar has been found anywhere near Heavener or even in the Midwestern United States. Two additional sandstone slabs, each with short runic markings, were each found a mile north and south of the stone. Scandinavian presence in the nearby town of Heavener is early and the likeliest source of the carving of the stone.

Runestone Festival
The park became the site for the annual Heavener Runestone Festival Fundraiser in 2011. It actually occurs on two weekends each year. Features of the event include Celtic and folk music, swordplay, displays of variety of merchant booths, games, a hike to view the runestone, and overnight camping. Cast and Volunteers are all dressed in costume and many attendees dress up as well. The purpose of the festival, besides pure enjoyment, is fundraising to support the park.

Park facilities
Heavener Park  offers , picnic tables, outdoor grills, primitive campsites with showers available, amphitheater, playground, hiking, exploring, and educational programs about the Runestone. The park also offers the top portion for private use for special events such as weddings, reunions birthdays etc for a fee.

Transfer from state to city park
The Oklahoma Tourism and Recreation Department announced in March 2011 that it would close the Heavener Runestone State Park on August 15, 2011, due to budget cuts.  However, the City of Heavener agreed to assume ownership and operation of the 55-acre park beginning July 1, 2011. The park is now managed by a group of volunteers that make a 501c3 non profit organization.

Notes

References

See also
Oklahoma runestones

External links
 Heavener Runestone Park - local tourism information

Parks in Oklahoma
Protected areas of Le Flore County, Oklahoma
Protected areas established in 1970
1970 establishments in Oklahoma